Albert Edwards Heywood (12 May 1913 – May 1989) was an English professional footballer who played as a goalkeeper for Sunderland.

References

1913 births
1989 deaths
Footballers from Hartlepool
English footballers
Association football goalkeepers
Spennymoor United F.C. players
Sunderland A.F.C. players
Hartlepool United F.C. players
Darlington Town F.C. players
English Football League players